The Global Ageing Network (formerly the International Association for Homes and Services for the Aging (IAHSA)) is an international, not-for-profit educational and charitable organization founded in 1994.  The mission of the Global Ageing Network is to connect and support care, housing and service providers worldwide to enhance the quality of life for aging. The Global Ageing Network's vision is a world in which all people have access to the highest quality care, services and housing in later life.

Affiliations
The Global Ageing Network is a Non-Governmental Organization (NGO) in Special Consultative Status with the United Nations. It works with other organizations, including:
AARP International
Alzheimer's Disease International
Helpage International
International Coalition of Intergenerational Programs
International Federation on Ageing
International Longevity Center
United Nations Department of Economic and Social Affairs

Education
The Global Ageing Network hosts a biennial international conference.
Past conference site have included:

Amsterdam, The Netherlands
Barcelona, Spain
Honolulu, Hawaii, United States of America
Vancouver, BC, Canada
Sydney, Australia
Trondheim, Norway
St. Julian's, Malta
London, England
Washington, D.C.
Shanghai, China
Perth, Australia

Membership
The Global Ageing Network membership is open providers of aging services, governments, universities, individuals and corporations.

Global Ageing Network
Global Ageing Network Members are from the following countries:
Australia, Austria, Canada, People's Republic of China, Czech Republic, Croatia, Denmark, Ecuador, Finland, France, Germany,  India, Italy, Japan, South Korea, Hong Kong, Malta,  The Netherlands, New Zealand, Norway, Portugal, Russia, Singapore, South Africa, Spain, Sweden, Switzerland, Taiwan, Thailand, United Kingdom, Ukraine and the United States of America.

External links
 Official web site

International non-profit organizations
Organizations established in 1994
Non-profit organizations based in Washington, D.C.
Gerontology organizations